Parliamentary elections were held in Austria on 6 May 1979. The Socialist Party won a fourth term in government, taking 95 of the 183 seats. Voter turnout was 92.2%. As of the 2017 elections, this is the most seats that an Austrian party has won in a free election, as well as the last time that an Austrian party has won an outright majority.

Results

References

Elections in Austria
Austria
Legislative
Austria